Can't Touch Us Now is the eleventh studio album by the British band Madness, released on their Lucky 7 Records label through Universal Music Catalogue (UMC) on 28 October 2016. The album marked the return of founder member Mark Bedford but the departure of Cathal Smyth (Chas Smash).

The album received supportive reviews from a variety of publications. For example, critic Jon Dennis of The Guardian labelled the group "legends" and described them as being "as entertaining as ever" in the release. The song "Pam the Hawk" was highlighted in particular for its lyrical themes.

A special collector's edition box set version of Can't Touch Us Now was released simultaneously with the album under the title "The Greatest Show on Earth". This version was packaged to resemble a board game complete with a playable card game.  It also contained a second disc consisting of demos.

Singles

The first single from the album, "Mr. Apples", was released in September 2016 and A-listed on BBC Radio 2. For the first time since Sugar And Spice in 2009 a scripted video was released. The song "Herbert" was released as a teaser on 14 October 2016, two weeks prior to the album. It was accompanied by an animated lyric video in the style of the album's artwork. On Friday 18 November, at the start of the 2016 "House of Fun Weekender" at Butlin's, the band announced title track "Can't Touch Us Now" as the second single from the album, accompanied by a brand new video which contained a performance by the band and footage from the album's ad.

Track listing

The Greatest Show on Earth (Can't Touch Us Now special edition)
Disc 1
The first disc contains the sixteen tracks from the original album version.

Personnel
Credits are adapted from the album's liner notes.

Madness
 Graham "Suggs" McPherson – lead and backing vocals, tambourine, brass arrangements  
 Mike Barson – upright piano, organ, harpsichord, electric piano, glockenspiel, celesta, Mellotron, guitar, saw, backing vocals, string and brass arrangements 
 Chris Foreman – guitar, Mellotron, Roland Juno-60, brass arrangements 
 Mark Bedford – bass, double bass, tuba 
 Lee Thompson – saxophone, lead vocals on track 9, backing vocals, Jew's harp, brass arrangements  
 Daniel Woodgate – drums, programming, brass arrangements  
Additional personnel
 Mike Kearsey – trombone, brass arrangements  
 Steve Hamilton – baritone saxophone, brass arrangements  
 Joe Auckland – trumpet, banjo, brass arrangements 
 Mez Clough – percussion 
 Ade Omotayo – backing vocals  
 Spider J. – backing vocals 
 London Community Gospel Choir – backing vocals
 Elise De Villaine – backing vocals 
 Jo Archard – violin  
 Kirsty Mangan – violin, string arrangements  
 Amy May – viola 
 Sarah Chapman – viola  
 Rachael Lander – cello 
 Clive Langer – production 
 Liam Watson – production
 Charlie Andrew – production, mixing, electric piano 
 Madness – production, string arrangements  
 Katie Earl – assistant mixing engineer
 Paul Agar – design, layout
 Perou – photography
The Greatest Show on Earth - disc 2
 Madness – vocals (1)
 Ade Omotayo – backing vocals (1)
 Lee Thompson – vocals (3, 9, 10, 12, 13), production (3, 9, 13), mixing (3, 9, 13)
 Nick Woodgate – vocals (4, 6)
 Mike Barson – vocals (5), all instruments (9), production (5, 8, 9, 11-14), mixing (5, 8, 11-14)
 Mark Bedford – bass (6)
 Graham "Suggs" McPherson – vocals (8, 11, 14)
 Clive Langer – production, mixing (1)
 Liam Watson – production, mixing (1)
 Chris Foreman – production, mixing (2, 7, 10)
 Keith Finch – production (3)
 Daniel Woodgate – production, mixing (4, 6)

Charts

Weekly charts

Year-end charts

Certifications and sales

References

External links
 

2016 albums
Madness (band) albums
Lucky 7 Records albums
Albums produced by Clive Langer
Albums produced by Charlie Andrew